The Florida Railroad was the first railroad to connect the east and west coasts of Florida, running from Fernandina to Cedar Key. The line later became part of the Seaboard Air Line Railroad, and, where still in use, is operated by CSX Transportation and the First Coast Railroad. The highway corridor of SR 24, US 301, and SR A1A/SR 200 closely parallels the former Florida Railroad.

History

Construction and early years

The shipping route between the east coast and gulf coast of the United States passes through the Straits of Florida, close to the Florida Reef that lies just off the Florida Keys. Prior to the 20th century many ships were wrecked around the southern end of the Florida peninsula. A railroad across the northern end of the Florida peninsula would allow cargoes from ships in the Gulf of Mexico to be transferred to ships in the Atlantic Ocean, and vice versa, without the risk of passage through the Straits of Florida, while cutting 800 miles off the trip.

In 1842 the United States Congress commissioned a survey of a route for a railroad between the St. Mary's River and Cedar Key in the Territory of Florida. In 1853 the Florida Legislature chartered the Florida Railroad to build a  gauge rail line from Fernandina (near the mouth of the St. Mary's River) to Tampa, Florida, with a branch to Cedar Key. The president and chief stockholder of the Florida Railroad was U.S. Senator David Levy Yulee. Yulee decided to complete the line to Cedar Key first, leaving the connection to Tampa for later. Construction started in Fernandina in 1855. By 1858 the rail line was open between Fernandina and Starke, but the Panic of 1857 had left the railroad on the edge of bankruptcy. Yulee had to surrender a majority interest in the railroad to a northern investment syndicate headed by Edward Dickerson to save the company. The line was completed to Gainesville in 1859 and Cedar Key in 1861. Other towns served by the railroad included Callahan, Baldwin, Waldo and Archer. At 156 miles in length, it was the longest railroad to be completed in Florida before the start of the American Civil War. 

The Florida Railroad was adversely affected by the Civil War. The USS Hatteras raided Cedar Key in January 1862, destroying the railroad's rolling stock and buildings. In March 1862 a Union squadron seized Fernandina. Shells fired by the USS Ottawa damaged the last train leaving Fernandina, killing or injuring several passengers, and almost killing Senator Yulee. In 1864, the Confederate States Army pulled up rails from the Florida Railroad to use on a new rail line from Live Oak, Florida to Lawton, Georgia (now known as DuPont. Union forces had also destroyed 30 miles of track leading from Cedar Key.

The Dickerson syndicate resumed operation of the Florida Railroad after the war, but with much of the railroad's equipment, facilities and track destroyed or seized, the company did not do well, and defaulted on its bonds to the Internal Improvement Fund in 1866. The railroad was auctioned off, and bought back by the Dickerson syndicate for twenty percent of the original value of the bonds. In 1872 the Florida Railroad was reorganized as the Atlantic, Gulf and West India Transit Company, still under the control of the Dickerson syndicate. The newly reorganized company began construction of the long-promised line to Tampa through subsidiary companies: the Peninsular Railroad operated the line from the connection with the Florida Railroad at Waldo to Ocala and Silver Springs, while the Tropical Florida Railroad ran from Ocala to Wildwood. In the meantime, the Atlantic, Gulf and West India Transit Company had leased the Fernandina and Jacksonville Railroad, providing a connection from its tracks at Hart's Road (later Yulee, Florida) to Jacksonville, Florida. Due to financial difficulties, the Atlantic, Gulf and West India Transit Company was reorganized as the Florida Transit Company in 1881, under the control of Sir Edward James Reed. The company was restructured again as the Florida Transit and Peninsular Railroad in 1883.

The Florida Transit and Peninsular Railroad was merged with the Florida Central and Western Railroad, Fernandina and Jacksonville Railroad, and Leesburg and Indian River Railroad in 1884-85 to form the Florida Railway and Navigation Company.

In 1900, a year after purchasing the majority of FC&P stock, the newly organized Seaboard Air Line Railway leased the FC&P and, in 1903, acquired it outright.

Seaboard Air Line ownership
Once under the ownership of the Seaboard Air Line, the Florida Railroad between Baldwin and Waldo would become part of the company's main line.  By 1925, track from Baldwin to Callahan was the Seaboard's Gross Subdivision, and the remaining track to Fernandina Beach was the Fernandina Subdivision.  By 1932, Seaboard abandoned track from Archer to Cedar Key.  Remaining track from Waldo to Archer was then part of the Seaboard's Brooksville Subdivision (which continued from Archer down the former Early Bird Branch to the former Tampa Northern Railroad).  The Brooksville Subdivision would be an alternate freight route from northern Florida to Tampa. The line was abandoned between Callahan and Yulee in 1954.

Later years
In 1967, the Seaboard Air Line merged with their long-time rival, the Atlantic Coast Line Railroad (ACL).  After the merger was complete, the company was named the Seaboard Coast Line Railroad (SCL).  In 1980, the Seaboard Coast Line's parent company merged with the Chessie System, creating the CSX Corporation.  The CSX Corporation initially operated the Chessie and Seaboard Systems separately until 1986, when they were merged into CSX Transportation.

Current conditions
Segments of the former Florida Railroad are still in service.  Since 2005, track from Fernandina Beach to Yulee is now operated by the First Coast Railroad.  Track from Callahan to Waldo is still owned by CSX and is now the Callahan Subdivision from Callahan to Baldwin, and the S Line (Wildwood Subdivision) from Baldwin to Waldo.  Today, State Road 24 runs along much of the former right of way of the route between Waldo and Cedar Key.  The Waldo Road Greenway also runs along the former right of way between Gainesville and Waldo.

Historic Stations

See also
Cross Florida Barge Canal

References

External links
Florida's First Cross-State Railroad

Defunct Florida railroads
Rail lines receiving land grants
Predecessors of the Seaboard Air Line Railroad
Railway companies established in 1853
Railway companies disestablished in 1872
5 ft gauge railways in the United States
1853 establishments in Florida
1872 disestablishments in Florida